Carrina "Karina" Huff (21 January 1961 – 18 April 2016) was a British actress, showgirl and television personality, mainly active in Italy.

Life and career
Born in London, Huff was first known in Italy as a showgirl in the Rai 2 variety show Signori si parte and as the television presenter of the Canale 5 musical program Popcorn. She later had roles of weight in a series of successful teen comedy films, notably Carlo Vanzina's Time for Loving, its immediate sequel Sapore di mare 2 and Vacanze di Natale. In 1989 she was in the main cast of the TV-series Zanzibar.

Following the failure of her marriage with an Italian land surveyor, Huff left showbusiness and returned with her son to London, where she became a teacher. In 2008, Huff was diagnosed with breast cancer, from which she was believed to be in remission. She later died from the same kind of breast cancer in April 2016.

Filmography
 Time for Loving (1982) 
 Vacanze di Natale (1983)
 Sapore di mare 2 - Un anno dopo (1983) 
 Domani mi sposo (1984)
 Summer Games (1984)
 Urban Animals (1987)
 The Gamble (1988)
 Demons 6: De Profundis (1989)
 The House of Clocks (1989)
 Voices from Beyond (1990)
 Le nuove comiche (1994)

Discography
 Singles 
 1981 - Mexico/Maraja (with El Pasador, Fontana, 6025 283)
 1982 - Tingimi di blu/Pelle a pelle (Polydor, 2060 262)

References

External links
 
 

1961 births
2016 deaths
British film actresses
British television personalities
Deaths from cancer in England
Deaths from breast cancer
Actresses from London
British emigrants to Italy